Chris Crenshaw (March 19, 1986) is an American baseball coach and former pitcher, who is the current head baseball coach of the Southern Jaguars. He played college baseball at Southwest Tennessee Community College in 2006, Southern for coach Roger Cador in 2007 and at Bethel University (Tennessee) from 2008 to 2009.

Playing career
Originally from Memphis, Tennessee, Crenshaw attended Germantown High School in Germantown, Tennessee. Upon graduation, Crenshaw attended Southwest Tennessee Community College where he pitched for the Saluqis in 2006. He pitched to a 5–0 record while recording 2.83 ERA in 54 innings. He transferred to Southern University following his freshman year. In 2007, Crenshaw threw 21 innings of 3.43 ERA baseball for the Jaguars. Crenshaw then transferred to Bethel University in Tennessee and finished his playing career with the Bethel Wildcats.

Coaching career
Crenshaw starting his coaching career as the recruiting coordinator and pitching coach for Southwest Tennessee. Crenshaw moved on to become the recruiting coordinator and pitching coach for the Jackson State Tigers.

On December 3, 2020, Crenshaw was named the interim head coach of Southern.

Head coaching record

References

External links
 Southern Jaguars bio

Southwest Tennessee Saluqis baseball players
Southern Jaguars baseball players
Bethel Wildcats baseball players
Southwest Tennessee Saluqis baseball coaches
Jackson State Tigers baseball coaches
Southern Jaguars baseball coaches
Baseball players from Tennessee
Baseball pitchers
1986 births
Living people